Geological Survey of Norway, abbreviation: NGU, is a Norwegian government agency responsible for geologic mapping and research. The agency is located in Trondheim with an office in Tromsø, with about 200 employees. It is subordinate to the Norwegian Ministry of Trade, Industry and Fisheries.

Mission

NGU's main work is related to collecting, processing and impart knowledge related to the physical, chemical and mineralogical characteristics of the countries bedrock, mineral resources, deposits and groundwater. Important areas include the Arctic, Antarctica, Svalbard and the continental shelf. With the motto "Geology for the Society", NGU provides maps and geological information in national databases. The activity is organized after five key principles:

 Long-term value creation from geological resources
 Increase use of geoscience knowledge in spatial planning and development
 Enhanced knowledge of the country's construction and geological processes
 Good communication, management and customization of geological knowledge
 Increased quality and efficiency through good interaction internally and externally

History
 The Geological Survey of Norway was established on 6 February 1858 by Order in Council. A few years earlier, the geology student Theodor Kjerulf had submitted the idea of a Norwegian geological survey to the Norwegian interior ministry. The survey would serve to map the country's agricultural areas and mineral deposits, as well as systematically study how the Norwegian landscape had been formed. In the mid-19th century Norway was modernizing quickly by developing industry and knowledge, along with evolving cultural life. An institution such as a Norwegian geological survey would be "convenient, scientifically necessary and honorable for the nation". The first years of its existence, mapping the bedrock, superficial deposits and mineral resources was its principal task, but it contributed to a Norwegian sense of ownership to the land, something that was especially important around 1905, after the Union with Sweden was dissolved. The manager Theodor Kjerulf, and his assistant, Tellef Dahll, shared the mapping of Norway. They purchased equipment, planned the work and trained their field assistants to carry out the surveys.

Manager Kjerulf along with Dahll and several assistants had, after about twenty years of work, completed three impressive sets of maps. Det sødenfjeldske in 1:400 000, Trondheim stift in 1:800 000 and Det nordlige Norge in 1:1 million. The maps and their descriptions gave new and valuable knowledge about the Norwegian landscape, and showed that it was possible to combine the scientific, economical and cultural ambitions Kjerulf had fronted when he set out to create the survey.

Organization

There are five support divisions within the agency:

Geological Mapping
Solid Earth Geology
Quaternary Geology
Marine Geology
Geochemistry and Hydrogeology
Geohazard and Earth Observation
Geological Resources and Environment
Geophysics
Natural Construction Materials
Mineral resources
NGU Laboratory

Information and Communication Technology
Geomatics and IT
HR & Resource Management
HR
Accounting and Administration
Communications and Public Relations
Communication

Directors

See also
Geology of Norway

References

External links

Government agencies of Norway
Organisations based in Trondheim
National geological agencies
Geological surveys
Government research